First United Methodist Church is a historic church at 306 Tuskeena Street in Wetumpka, Alabama.  It was built in 1854 and added to the National Register of Historic Places in 1973.

See also
Historical Marker Database

References

External links
 

Methodist churches in Alabama
Churches on the National Register of Historic Places in Alabama
National Register of Historic Places in Elmore County, Alabama
Greek Revival church buildings in Alabama
Italianate architecture in Alabama
Churches completed in 1854
Churches in Elmore County, Alabama
Historic American Buildings Survey in Alabama
1854 establishments in Alabama
Italianate church buildings in the United States